Brodersby may refer to several places in Germany:

 Brodersby, Rendsburg-Eckernförde
 Brodersby, Schleswig-Flensburg